Kait is a village on the south-west coast of New Ireland, Papua New Guinea. It is located in Konoagil Rural LLG. Two notable rivers flow into the Bismarck Sea here.

The villagers speak the Kandas language.

References

Populated places in New Ireland Province